Zicheng Liu from Microsoft Research, Redmond, WA was named Fellow of the Institute of Electrical and Electronics Engineers (IEEE) in 2015 for contributions to visual processing for multimedia interaction.

References

Fellow Members of the IEEE
Living people
21st-century American engineers
Year of birth missing (living people)
American electrical engineers